Greenfield Park is a hamlet in Ulster County, New York, United States. Greenfield Park has a post office with ZIP code 12435, which opened on December 23, 1852.

References

Hamlets in Ulster County, New York
Hamlets in New York (state)